Matti Latvala (11 May 1868, Vimpeli - 5 July 1964) was a Finnish farmer and politician. He was a member of the Parliament of Finland from 1909 to 1916 and again from 1919 to 1922, representing the Agrarian League.

References

1868 births
1964 deaths
People from Vimpeli
People from Vaasa Province (Grand Duchy of Finland)
Centre Party (Finland) politicians
Members of the Parliament of Finland (1909–10)
Members of the Parliament of Finland (1910–11)
Members of the Parliament of Finland (1911–13)
Members of the Parliament of Finland (1913–16)
Members of the Parliament of Finland (1919–22)